Firth Moor, or Firthmoor is a place in the borough of Darlington and the ceremonial county of County Durham, England. It is situated to the south-east of Darlington town centre.

References

External links
 Firthmoor & District Community Association

Villages in County Durham
Suburbs of Darlington
Places in the Tees Valley